The Shochiku Robins were a Japanese baseball team that played in Nippon Professional Baseball (NPB). The franchise originated in the Japanese Baseball League (NPB's predecessor) and existed from 1936–1953, when it merged with the Taiyo Whales. Originally based in Tokyo, the club moved to Osaka in 1941.

Franchise history

Japanese Baseball League

Dai Tokyo 
The club was founded as Dai Tokyo before the 1936 Japanese Baseball League season, with ownership by the Tokyo daily newspaper Kokumin Shimbun. The team made history that year by signing an African-American player, Jimmy Bonner, 11 years before Jackie Robinson broke the Major League Baseball color barrier.

The worst team in the league its first year, the club improved in spring 1937.

Lion 
On August 31, midway through the 1937 fall season, the team changed its name to the Lion Baseball Club when it was acquired by Komajiro Tamura, with sponsorship by Lion Toothpaste.

Late in the 1940 season, the Japan Baseball League outlawed English nicknames (due to rising tensions with the West). Owner Tamura refused to change the team's name, insisting that "Lion" is Japanese (In actuality, he wanted to honor the team's sponsorship contract with the Lion Corporation.) The team completed the season as Lion, finishing in last place, 50 games behind Tokyo Kyojin.

Asahi 
In 1941 the team moved from Tokyo to Osaka and acquiring new sponsorship from Asahi Shimbun; from 1941 to 1944 it was called the Asahi Baseball Club. In 1943 the team had its first winning season, finishing at 41-36-7.

Pacific 
After the resumption of the Japanese Baseball League in 1946 (after World War II), the team changed its name to Pacific Baseball Club (popularly known as Taihei — "peace"). Meanwhile, team owner Komajiro Tamura started another franchise that season, Gold Star, which signed many of Asahi's former players, as well as Asahi's former manager Michinori Tubouchi.

To fill out its roster, Pacific signed long-time Tokyo Kyojin/Yomiuri Giants pitcher Victor Starffin, as well as some other famous players. These signings led to a serious conflict, and Pacific was forced to forfeit four games that season.

One homegrown player who rose to prominence was pitcher and part-time infielder Juzo Sanada (later known as Shigeo Sanada), who eventually became a four-time 20-game-winner and a member of the Japanese Baseball Hall of Fame.

Taiyo Robins 
English nicknames returned to Japanese baseball after the 1946 season, and the team changed its name to the Taiyo Robins. Still owned by Komajiro Tamura, "Taiyo" came from Tamura's fabric store Taiyo Rayon, and "Robins" from Tamura's personal nickname, "Koma" ("robins" in Japanese). The kanji for "Taiyo" (太陽) has connotations of the sun, and for a brief confusing period the team featured the words "Suns" on its road uniforms and "Robins" on its home uniforms.

Starffin left after the 1947 season, and none of the name variations helped improve the team's play. The JBL reorganized after the 1949 season; the franchise ended its Japanese Baseball League run with a losing season every single year except 1943.

Nippon Professional Baseball

Shochiku Robins 
In 1950, when the JBL reorganized to become Nippon Professional Baseball, the Robins joined NPB's Central League. A share of the team was sold to the Shochiku Corporation and it became the Shochiku Robins. Amazingly, that year the team won 46 more games than the year before, totaling 98 wins and coming in first in their division. Led by league MVP Makoto Kozuru and his 51 home runs and still-league record 163 RBI, as well as Sanada's 39 victories, the Robins played in the inaugural Japan Series, ultimately falling to the Mainichi Orions, 4 games to 2.

Merger with the Taiyo Whales 
After a mediocre year in 1951, they lost 84 games in 1952. It was decided that any Central League teams ending the season with a winning percentage below .300 would be disbanded or merged with other teams. The Robins fell into this category, and were merged with the Taiyo Whales to become the Taiyo Shochiku Robins in January 1953. The resulting franchise is now known as the Yokohama DeNA BayStars.

Managers
 1936 (spring): Katsuzo Ito
 1936 (fall)–1937: Tokuro Konishi
 1938: Tokuro Konishi/Katsuo Takada
 1939–1940: Katsuo Takada
 1941–1943: Aiichi Takeuchi
 1944: Michinori Tubouchi
 1946: Sadayoshi Fujimoto
 1947: Michinori Tubouchi/Sadayoshi Fujimoto
 1948: Nobuyoshi Hasegawa
 1949: Shuichi Ishimoto
 1950: Tokuro Konishi
 1951: Kyouichi Nitta
 1952: Kyouichi Nitta/Tokuro Konishi

Japanese Baseball League season-by-season records

Nippon Professional Baseball season-by-season records

References 

 
Defunct Nippon Professional Baseball teams
Baseball teams established in 1936
Sports teams in Kyoto Prefecture